Stephen Citron (1924-2013) was a graduate of the Juilliard School and a writer of songs performed by the likes of Liza Minnelli, Dory Previn, and Édith Piaf. He was married to the writer and fellow avid amateur cook, Anne Edwards.

He has written biography or criticism about Noël Coward, Cole Porter, Stephen Sondheim, Andrew Lloyd Webber, Vivien Leigh, Edgar Allan Poe, Queen Elizabeth II, Princess Margaret, Oscar Hammerstein II, Alan Jay Lerner, and Jerry Herman.

In addition from teaching songcraft in a Carnegie Hall studio, he also wrote books about the creation of music and musicals.

See also
Mr. Blandings Builds His Dream House

References

1924 births
2013 deaths
American biographers
American male biographers
American male composers
American critics
American male songwriters
Juilliard School alumni
20th-century American pianists
20th-century American composers
American male pianists
20th-century American male musicians